Złoczew  is a town in Sieradz County, Łódź Voivodeship, Poland, with 3,340 inhabitants (2020).

History
The first known historical reference to the town of Złoczew was in 1496. It is known that the property was part of Unikowski and belonged to the parish in Uników. Most likely, the owner of Złoczew in the mid-15th century was Jan Ruszkowski of the Clan Pobóg.

16th to 18th centuries

In the mid-16th century, the feudal lord of the area was Stanisław Ruszkowski (1529-1597), cavalry captain in expeditions of Stefan Batory against Moscow, knight of Sieradz, and Warrant Officer of Kalisz, who is buried in the monastery Order of Cistercians  in Koło, where his tombstone is preserved.  However, Złoczew owes its urban character to his son, Andrzej Ruszkowski (1563-1619), knight of Kalisz and owner of the Nowa Wieś, Barczew, and Ruszków.  In 1600, he brought the Order of Cistercians to Złoczew, building their church and monastery, and in 1601 he funded the construction of the parish church for Złoczew.

Andrzej Ruszkowski had ambitious plans to make Złoczew an important center of craft and trade, and raise the status of the city from its humble village origins.  Złoczew was ideally placed at the crossroads of trade routes between Wieruszów, Sieradz, and Wieluń, which gave it a great advantage in the effort to obtain municipal rights.  On 14 December 1605, King Sigismund III Vasa issued from Cracow the charter for the new town of Złoczew, based on Magdeburg law.

Andrzej Ruszkowski moved his registered office to Złoczew and built his brick manor house there between 1614 and 1616. In 1651, in the center of the market square, he built the town hall with a wooden tower.  Not far from Złoczew, in two neighboring villages Szklana Huta and Stara Huta, were built two glassworks, where probably produced window glass and bottle glass, and the surrounding area saw the construction of several mills and windmills. In the 18th century, as a result of large influx of Jewish origin population, the first synagogue was built in Złoczew.

January Uprising in Złoczew
After the Partitions of Poland and Napoleonic Wars, from 1815 the town was part of so-called Congress Poland within the Russian Partition of Poland. During a protest in Warsaw on 27 February 1861, Russian soldiers had fired on the gathered Poles, killing five, among them Marcel Karczewski, a landowner from Sieradz. In April, Złoczew nobility, common people, and Jews threw out the pro-Russian mayor Paweł Kużawski and his clerk. This event helped contribute to the January Uprising (1863–64) in and around Złoczew.

On 10 February 1863, independence activist Makary Drohomirecki and some of his followers rode into Złoczew. Drohomirecki assembled in the market square and read aloud the "Manifesto of the National Government" to the residents of Złoczew, a treatise calling for Polish independence from Russia.  Some volunteers from Złoczew joined the independence movement at this assemblage.  On 15 February 1863, a local Russian-born peasant named Aleksander Rumowicz from Potok, betrayed the independence movement's location to the Russians.  Russian Cossacks and pro-Russian Polish troops were dispatched from the garrison at Sieradz, numbering around 500 strong and under the command of Russian officers Major Hanczakowa and Major Pisanka, and soon surrounded Drohomirecki and 32 of his followers in a wooded area. In the battle, five to eight insurgents and Drohomirecki himself were killed.  Some of the insurgents were captured and some were killed by after being chased down by mounted Cossacks.  Only a few insurgents managed to survive and escape.

On 28 June 1863 in the village Potok a troop of the national gendarmerie made a judgment on traitor Aleksander Rumowicz, and he was subsequently hanged from a tree.  His wife was paid 200 rubles by the local Russian garrison as compensation for his death.

The last battle in Złoczew was fought on 22 August 1863 by a unit of pro-independence General Edmund Taczanowski on the fields between Złoczew and Kamionka.  The defeat of the Polish forces represented the end of the independence movement in the area, with General Taczanowski fleeing to France and then Turkey, where he tried to raise support for a Polish liberation army. Many residents from Złoczew helped the insurgents, repairing weapons, providing medicines and medical supplies, giving money, weapons, clothes, and food.

For its role in supporting the attempted rebellion, Złoczew ceased to be a private city and became a government-administered city.  Some rebel supporters were deported to Russia while others were imprisoned in Sieradz prison. On the night of 27/28 November 1864, the Tsarist troops surrounded the Cistercians Monastery in Złoczew;  the monastery was plundered and destroyed, with the monks being sent to a monastery in Widawa. The graves of insurgents remaining to this day in Pyszków, Brzeźnio, Klonowa, Gruszczyce, Poddębice and Widawa.

20th century and World War II
Poland finally regained independence after World War I in 1918. In 1919, Złoczew's municipal rights were restored by the Polish administration. In 1939, the city's population reached a record high of 5,300 people, of which about 40% were Jews.

The German invasion of Poland, which started World War II, on 1 September 1939 began when the first bombs fell on Wieluń, which was located just  from the border between Poland and Germany, not far from Złoczew.  The Wehrmacht entered Złoczew on 4 September 1939, when German soldiers from the Leibstandarte SS Adolf Hitler (LSSAH), together with the soldiers of the 17th Wehrmacht Infantry Division, killed about 200 residents of the city, both Christians and Jews. Eighty percent of the city, around 240 houses, businesses, and government buildings, were subsequently burned, and imagery of Złoczew's burning by the Wehrmacht was used in Nazi war films displayed in the first week of the war in the cinemas of the Third Reich. Among the victims were men, women, and children, including both residents of Złoczew and refugees from the neighboring village. After the war, investigators managed to identify 71 victims, of which 58 came from Złoczew. Investigations carried out by German prosecutors after the war was discontinued due to the difficulty in determining exactly which units of the 17th Infantry Division (Wehrmacht) and LSSAH were at that time in Złoczew.

The Germans began to terrorize the Jews, kidnapping them for forced labor, and then at the end of 1939, forcing many to leave the town. Most of those who left went to Lublin or Warsaw. Some fled east across the Soviet border. In late 1939, the Germans also expelled many Poles, including families of the mayor, parish priest, teachers, doctors, notaries, merchants and pharmacy owner. Further expulsions of Poles were carried out in March 1941 and April 1944. In March 1941 hundreds of Poles were expelled and deported to a transit camp in Łódź, where they were held for several weeks and subjected to brutal searches. Poles were then deported to the General Government (German-occupied central Poland). In November 1941, in Złoczew Germans conducted segregation of nearly 800 Poles expelled from nearby villages, who were then deported to slave labor either to Germany or to German colonists in occupied Poland. In April 1944, the Germans expelled 184 Poles, who were then deported to forced labor in Germany and German-occupied France. Each time the expellees' houses were handed over to German colonists as part of the Lebensraum policy. The Germans operated a prison in Złoczew that was subordinate to the prison in Sieradz. In 1940, the Germans forced the remaining Jews into a ghetto and brought several hundred Jews from neighboring villages there too. In all, about 2,500 Jews lived in the ghetto. Early in 1942, about 100 men and teen aged boys were sent to forced labor camps. In May or June 1942, the remaining residents, probably more than 2000, were assembled in a local church where they were held for several days with minimum food and water. They were forced into trucks and taken to Chełmno extermination camp where they were immediately gassed. There were no survivors from this last round up and perhaps 20 Jewish survivors in total from Złoczew.

During the war, Złoczew was extremely damaged and deserted. The center of town has never been rebuilt, and its population has never recovered to prewar numbers.

Architectural monuments
Some of the most prominent points of interest in the town include the Bernardine monastery complex built in 1603-1607 from donation by Andrzej Ruszkowski. From 1608 to 1864 the only residents of the monastery were Bernardine monks. In 1683-1692 the complex was expanded by Wojciech Urbański, warrant officer from Wieluń. The monastery was destroyed twice by fire, in 1719 and in 1808. From 1949 Camaldolese nuns live there. On 6 May 1986 the monastery was officially granted to Camaldolese nuns and became their property.

Church of St. Cross from the late renaissance. The main altar in the rococo style of the mid-17th century, with carved crucifixion group. The two side altars - in rococo style. One of the sculpture of St. Anna's second sculpture Joachim - baroque from the 18th century. The next two side altars in rococo style with paintings St. Anthony and Barbara - 18th century, St. Joseph from the mid-19th century and St. Teresa - 18th century.  In one of the side altars there is a painting Our Lady of Złoczew's from the late 16th or beginning of the 17th century. In the chapel (now vestry) rococo altar with paintings of St. John Cantius and St. Trinity. From the 18th century and rococo sculptures of St. Casimir and St. Valentine. During the renovation lasted several months following works were performed: repair of the church roof, the installation of lightning protection, restoration of the cross on the spire and tower of the church and replacing the floor in the church.
Ruszowski palace from the beginning of the 17th century; rebuilt in the 18th and 19th centuries. Behind the palace was a park in the English style. During the Second World War the Germans rebuilt the building by removing arcades and destine it to the prison. After the war, in the palace was a primary school and secondary school dormitory. After the liquidation of dormitory building fell into disrepair. After Polish accession to the European Union in the framework of co-financing from the European fund, the palace was renovated. Currently in the palace there is headquartered office of the town and commune of Złoczew.

Education
In Złoczew there are three schools:
 Nicolaus Copernicus Primary School
 Andrzej Ruszkowski Public Middle School 
 Secondary Schools in Złoczew which includes:
 Wojciech Urbański High School
 Technical School
 Basic Vocational School

Honorary citizens of Złoczew
 prelate Piotr Światły from 9 November 2007 
 Congregation of the Camaldolese Nuns from 1 January 2009

Notable people associated with Złoczew
 Maria Klemensa (Helena) Staszewska (1890-1943) – Polish nun born in Złoczew, Blessed Catholic Church.
 Wojciech Urbanski (xxxx-1692) - Senator in the Polish-Lithuanian Commonwealth, the owner of Złoczew (1671-1692), took part in the Battle of Vienna, fought in the battle of Battle of Parkany.
 Kazimierz Błeszyński (1703-1757) - Member of Parliament, ensign greater of Sieradz (1748-1757)
 Jarosława Lewicka (born 1935) - the last living recipient of the Righteous Among the Nations award from Yad Vashem to reside in Israel

See also
 Pacification operations in German-occupied Poland

References

Cities and towns in Łódź Voivodeship
Sieradz County
Kalisz Governorate
Łódź Voivodeship (1919–1939)
Holocaust locations in Poland
Jewish communities destroyed in the Holocaust